EFM Records is an American independent record label and corporation founded in 2008 by music producer Dito Godwin. Designed as an artist friendly label, It 's primary focus is on notable artists, who prefer to have more individual control of their art, as well as development projects hand-picked by Godwin.

History

2008 - 2010
It was Formed in 2008 by Dito Godwin and a group of corporate investors with the primary goal of being an artist-friendly label focused on modern technology and distribution, while still supporting more traditional methods such as radio and retail.

In late 2008, EFM Records signed Former Interscope recording artist and lead singer/guitarist of Pseudopod (band) Kevin Carlberg, and in early 2009 brought on three more Artists including, Kathryn Gallagher (Daughter of Actor Peter Gallagher), Mike Stone (guitarist of Heavy Metal band Queensrÿche), and Carlton Pride (son of Country Music Hall of Fame's Charlie Pride).

By mid-2009 EFM Records had partnered with Mi5 Recordings which facilitated major North American distribution with EMI Music Group and Caroline Distribution. However, in early 2010 EFM parted ways with EMI and Mi5 and signed a deal with Bungalo and Universal Music Group.

In 2010 the label signed Rolan Bolan (son of Mark Bolan), punk band Hear Kitty Kitty, and alternative modern punk band The Stick People.

As of 2009, the label had showcased digital works from all its artists, but had yet to release a single or a full-length CD, stating that they will be released in 2010.

After the death of Kevin Carlberg, Godwin worked with Rolan Bolan on recording "Missing Me", written by Kevin Carlberg, and assisted in the Video production.
  
In July 2010, EFM confirmed a dual release date of August 17 for two Artists "Hear Kitty Kitty" and "The Stick People"  through Universal Music Group.

2011 - present 
EFM released The Stick People in digital form on July 19, 2011,

The same year, Jani Lane (best known as the lead singer of Warrant), died on August 11th, 2011.

President and CEO of EFM Records, Dito Godwin stated, "I've been working with Jani Lane over the last few months putting songs together in an effort to supply some of my clients with his incredible songs as well as putting a record together for him to possibly release on my label. His passing has shocked and saddened me to the point of tears. A great person whose talent was far greater than most people will ever know. I produced a number of songs for his solo project in the late '90s. My connection with Jani as artist and producer was textbook perfect. Upon completion of those sessions, we both said it was a mind-blowing experience to work together and we would do it again, [and] we did. The world will truly miss Jani Lane. I'm so lucky to have been a small part of his life. RIP Jani. I'm numb".

Current artists

Past artists
Kevin Carlberg, Former Interscope recording artist and lead singer/guitarist of Pseudopod, Pop/Rock
Kathryn Gallagher, Daughter of Peter Gallagher, Pop/Rock

References

External links 
Official site
Godwin Productions at MySpace

American independent record labels